Mount Mansfield Union High School (MMU) is a high school located near the center of Jericho, Vermont.  It is accredited by the New England Association of Secondary Schools and Colleges and by the Vermont Department of Education.

Mount Mansfield Union High School is part of the Mount Mansfield Modified Union School District, and serves students from Jericho, Underhill, Richmond, Huntington, and Bolton.

U.S. News ranked MMU as the best high school in  Vermont, both public and private. In April 2017 it was ranked as the third best high school in Vermont and at number 893 in the nation. MMU has also been cited by BusinessWeek as being the "best high school in Vermont" and "among the best in New England", based on academic performance and standardized test scores.

Curriculum
Language is not required for graduation from MMU, but since most students go to college or some other form of higher education, it is common to take at least two years of a foreign language. MMU offers Spanish, Latin, and French. Although only these are offered on campus, students may obtain credits through online courses or other local campuses, including that of the University of Vermont. Students also have the option of attending Essex Technical Center or Burlington Technical Center.

Math levels at MMU are slightly different from usual. The levels after basic math are Algebra 1, Geometry, Algebra 2, and Pre-Calculus, whereas most schools have Algebra 2 before Geometry. The school has chosen to do this because of the use of geometry on the standardized tests that MMU juniors take.

The school uses a 4.33 GPA scale.

Sports offered 
 Football - State Champions 2018
 Baseball - State Champions 1980, 1995, 1998, 2000
 Boys' Basketball - State Champions 1995, 2004, 2005, 2012
 Girls' Basketball - State Champions 2019 (tie)
 Boys' Soccer - State Champions 1968 (tie), 1971, 1987 (tie), 1995, 2000
 Girls' Soccer - State Champions 1991, 1992, 2003
 Boys' Ice Hockey - State Champions 1984, 1988
 Girls' Ice Hockey - State Champions 2016
 Girls' Track - State Champions 1998, 1999, 2004
 Boys' Track
 Girls' Cross Country
 Boys' Cross Country - State Champions 2005, 2006, 2007, 2009, 2010, 2011
 Boys' Lacrosse - State Champions 2005
 Girls' Lacrosse - State Champions 2003, 2004
 Boys' Golf - State Champions 2005
 Boys' Alpine Skiing - State Champions 2005
 Girls' Alpine Skiing
 Dance - State Champions 2011, 2016
 Field Hockey - State Champions 1977 (tie), 1978
 Boys' Nordic Skiing - State Champions 2016
 Girls' Nordic Skiing
 Softball - State Champions 1996, 2004
 Wrestling - 2013 NVAC Champions
 Boys' Tennis
 Girls' Tennis
 Boys' Indoor Track
 Girls' Indoor Track

Activities offered
 Advisory (mandatory for full-time students)
 American Sign Language Club
 Astronomy Club
 Book Club
 Card Game Playing Student-Led Group
 CLASH (philosophy and debate club)
 Community Service Club (4 hours of community service are required for all students every semester, and the club helps students meet or go beyond this requirement.)
 Theater Department
 Economics Club (Winners of 2015 and 2017 Vermont Treasury Cup)
 Environmental Club
 Film Club
 GSTA (Gay, Straight, Transgender Alliance)
 International Club
 Juggling Club
 Math League
 Model United Nations Student-Led Group
 Outing Club
 Plant Club
 The Tapeworm (School Satirical Newspaper
 Scholars Bowl (2013, 2017 Medlar Cup winners)
 Science Fiction Club
 Student Council
 Yearbook
 Literary Magazine (MMUSE)

References

Educational institutions in the United States with year of establishment missing
Public high schools in Vermont
Buildings and structures in Jericho, Vermont
Schools in Chittenden County, Vermont